Woodsman (also, woodsmen, pl.) is a competitive, co-ed intercollegiate sport in the United States, Canada and elsewhere based on various skills traditionally part of forestry educational and technical training programs. In North America, the sport currently is organized in five regional divisions: northeastern, mid-Atlantic, southern, midwestern, and western.

History
Woodsmen or lumberjack competitions have their roots in competitions that took place in logging camps among loggers.  As loggers were paid for piece work, the ability to perform a specific task more quickly, or with a degree of showmanship, was something to be admired. Today the tradition survives on college campuses across Canada and the United States, as well as on various competitive circuits worldwide, including ESPN's now-defunct Great Outdoor Games.  The sport is most popular in areas of the world with a strong logging tradition.

Active schools in Canada

The following is a partial list of colleges in Canada with active teams:

Maritime College of Forest Technology - formerly known as the Maritime Forest Ranger School
McGill University
Nova Scotia Agricultural College
University of New Brunswick

Active schools in the United States
The following is a partial list of colleges in the US with active teams:

 Allegany College of Maryland
 California Polytechnic State University
 Central Oregon Community College
 Colby College
 Colorado State University
 Dartmouth College
 Finger Lakes Community College
 Flathead Valley Community College
 Haywood Community College
 Humboldt State University
 Maine Maritime Academy
 Modesto Junior College
 Montana State University
 Montgomery Community College
 Northern Arizona University
 Oregon State University
 Paul Smith's College
 Penn State Mont Alto
 Penn State University
 Pennsylvania College of Technology
 Shasta College
 SUNY Alfred State College
 SUNY College of Agriculture and Technology Cobleskill
 SUNY College of Environmental Science and Forestry
 Unity College, Maine
 University of California, Berkeley
 University of Connecticut
 University of Idaho
 University of Maine
 University of Montana
 University of Nevada, Reno
 University of New Hampshire
 University of Tennessee
 University of Vermont
 West Virginia University
 Iowa State University

Competitive structure

Unlike many college sports which have some degree of seasonality, members of collegiate woodsman teams compete throughout the academic year.  Competitions typically take the form of a "meet", a series of events run throughout the day of competition.  Meets may take place outdoors or inside a suitably large structure to safely accommodate the potentially dangerous tools used.  An entry fee is charged to cover the cost of providing timber, awards, and food.

Schools compete in teams of six.  A school has the option to send multiple teams, each of which pays an entry fee.  Events are divided among team members at the discretion of the entering schools.  There are, however, a series of team events in which every member is expected to participate fully.  Men and Women's team typically utilize the same equipment, however in competition some rules are adjusted by gender.  If a school chooses to send a mixed-gender, or Jack and Jill team, Men's rules apply.  Each team is coordinated by a captain.

Events may be run as single, double, triple or team events at the discretion of the hosting school.  The list and structure of the competition is typically published beforehand in order to allow team members to prepare for their assigned events.

Scoring

Most events are scored based on the time taken by the competitor to complete.  Teams are scored as a whole, and each event is generally weighted equally.  A point system for scoring may be used, where the first place competitor is awarded 100 points, and runners-up receive a percentage of the winner's score based on their performance in comparison.  A second system calculates a winning team's place based solely on placement, and does not take into consideration the spread between each team's performance.

Events
The following is a list of typical events run at collegiate woodsmen competitions:

Axe throw

This event requires a thrower to place a double-bit Axe as close to the center of a target as possible from a set distance away. The axe is released in such a way that it rotates about the midpoint of the handle and, ideally, contacts the center of the target with only one edge.  Scores are awarded from 1-3 or 1-5 points (depending on the target), with the highest score being a bulls-eye.  Competitors are given three practice throws and three scored throws.  A hit which crosses a line from one ring into the next is typically awarded the higher score.  If an axe should contact the target with both edges, such that the handle sticks straight out, the handle is tapped downward until only one edge makes contact, which is used to calculate the score.  If, during this process, the axe falls from the target, no points are awarded.

Splitting

 
Splitting can take several forms, but is typically performed with one or more bolts of hardwood and as a single, double or triples event. Splitting axes in the 4-6 pound range are used, and mauls are typically prohibited as they provide a sizable competitive advantage. Logs are always placed on the ground, and occasionally within a car tire to prevent a clumsy competitor from accidentally striking their own feet or legs with the axe.  Points are awarded for the time to complete the event, and penalties are assessed for incomplete splits, where fibers still connect pieces of split wood together.

 The "Dot Split" version of the event involves a two-inch dot placed at the top of each bolt, normally at the natural, rather than the geometric center of the log.  The competitor is required to split the log into four full-length pieces, each having some amount of paint present on the end.
The barrel split event requires a bolt to be split into numerous pieces and inserted into an opening in the top of a barrel, which is usually 6-8 inches wide.  The event ends when all pieces have been completely inserted.

Wood chopping

Underhand chop

The Underhand, or horizontal chop is an axe event which involves cutting a bolt of wood set horizontally in a stanchion into two pieces.  The event is scored for time.  During the event, the competitor stands on top of a log set horizontally in a stanchion.  The competitor swings the axe between their feet at a 45 degree angle on two opposing faces, opening up a face that extends halfway through the diameter of the log.  The competitor then switches sides and severs the log by opening a face on the opposite side, working only on the second side until the two meet.

Standing block chop

The mechanics of wood removal for the Standing Block or Vertical chop are similar to those of the underhand, however, because the log is set vertically, the technique involved is different from the underhand chop.  A competitor must angle their axe swings to open a face at 45 degrees skyward, and at 45 degrees below the horizontal in order to create the same two faces that are needed to chop one side of the log.

Hard hit chopping

This event is a variation on the underhand chop which scores a competitor not on time, but on the number of axe swings needed to sever the log.

Sawing

Bow saw 

The Bow Saw event is most typically run as a singles or as a team event. A 36-inch bow saw fitted with a competition-grade peg and raker blade is most frequently used. In a singles event, a competitor is typically asked to cut a series of thin slices, called cookies, from a log, which is chained down to a stanchion.  Each disk of wood sawn must be complete, or a penalty is assessed.  As a team event, each member cuts one or two disks, and team members switch after completing their cuts.  This event is scored for total time to complete all cuts.

Crosscut sawing 

This event is run as either a doubles or team event.  As a crosscut saw is a two-man saw, each cut must be made with a pair of teammates.  A series of cookies are sawed off for time, as in the bow saw event.  The saws used for these events tend to be the most expensive individual pieces of equipment for a woodsman team, running into thousands of dollars for a competition-filed peg and raker or M tooth saw.  Great pains are taken before the event is run to examine the log being cut for knots or imperfections which can damage these very aggressively filed saws.

Single buck 

The single buck event utilizes a two-man crosscut saw operated by one individual, and is almost universally run as a singles event. The saw is typically of the same grade as the crosscut saw used in the two man event, but may be custom filed for one person operation. The competitor is required to make a single cut or cookie through one large log.  These logs are typically the largest diameter wood present at the competition.  A competitor is allowed a starting cut, usually measured to be no more than 6-8 inches, or the width of a US One Dollar bill.  A teammate is allowed to straddle the log and place a wedge to ease the competitor's progress and prevent binding of the saw.

Chainsaw Events

Stock Saw 
This event is scored for time. A competitor wearing appropriate safety gear makes a series of cuts in a log. The event can be designed in various ways to emphasize visual accuracy or the ability to run their chainsaw at the peak of its power band. In the interest of fairness, the same saw is typically used throughout the day to eliminate any variables between saws (which can be significant, even for the same model saw).

 The "Down Up" version of the event requires a cut downward (on a pulling chain, using the bottom of the bar) followed by an upward cut (on a pushing chain, using the top of the bar). This is by far the most common version of the event.
 The "Down Up Down" event adds an additional down cut to the above.
 The "Up Down" event typically involves a cut halfway up a log, which then requires that the competitor remove their saw from the log and complete the cut from the top of the log.  This version of the event is timed with an accuracy component based on how closely the two half-cuts met. This version is rarely seen in current competitions.

Disk stack 

The chainsaw Disk Stack event involves cutting a series of stacked disks from a log set vertically in a stanchion. A competitor is given a set area of wood to cut, and a time limit, usually two minutes. Holding the saw at eye level, the competitor saws off successive disks, leaving previous cuts stacked on top of the log. The event is scored based on the number of whole disks left on top of the log at the time the competitor announces they are done. Time is used as a secondary tie-breaker.  Performed well, it is not unusual for a competitor to cut in excess of 20 disks. During the event, the competitor is not allowed to manipulate the disks in any fashion other than sawing off additional disks.

Pulpwood toss

The pulpwood toss event is typically run as a team event, and requires all competitors to throw a set of four pieces of pulpwood between two pairs of stakes, typically set 15–20 feet apart. The event is typically timed until 48 qualifying pieces of pulpwood have been thrown.  A piece of wood earns a point toward the 48 possible points if it breaks the plane between the two stakes after the competitor is done throwing. This means that pulpwood thrown too far, not far enough, or not between the stakes is not counted. Sticks which a competitor can knock into place with subsequent throws are counted.

Log rolling and decking

Log rolling or log decking (not to be confused with birling) are two events that involve the use of peaveys and a pair of competitors to maneuver a log to a set destination.  In log decking, the competitors must push the log along a track of wooden beams and usually up to the top of a ramp.  In log rolling, the competitors may either have a straight course or a course which requires a series of turns in order to maneuver a log to its finish line along the ground.  This event is typically run as either a doubles or team event.

Birling

This event traditionally involves two competitors, each on one end of a free-floating log in a body of water. The athletes battle to stay on the log by sprinting, kicking the log, and using a variety of techniques as they attempt to cause the opponent to fall off. Due to a lack of a body of water nearby, some schools will use a swimming pool to house a log or build a "dry birling" station using a log on a spindle, allowing it to spin freely. Some schools will run this event in a tournament style, while others will time how long a competitor is able to stay on the log or count the number of revolutions completed within a time limit due to safety concerns.

Pole climbing

This event involves a harnessed and belayed climber getting to the top of a featureless pole as quickly as possible.  The pole is typically the size of a standard telephone pole, and the climber wears homemade spikes in order to make rapid upward progress.

Fire build

The Fire Build event involves making a fire using a tool, a piece of dried wood, and strike anywhere matches. A can of soapy water is placed on top of the fire, and time is called for the event when the can boils over. The event may be run with one or two competitors and using one or two tools. When two tools are used, one tool is usually a hatchet or small axe, and the second tool is a knife. The event is scored for time.

Culture
The culture on teams which participate in woodsmen competitions varies widely from that of a drinking club with chainsaws to a school sanctioned varsity sport with all the associated visibility and expectations thereof.  The sport has been co-educational for all of recent memory, and female competitors are for the most part given equal treatment to men, though the professional circuit has largely chosen to ignore women.  Fraternization among team members is frequent.

The atmosphere at a woodsmen meet oscillates between the seriousness competition and the friendly environment of the county fair. Competitors practice specific events for weeks and months, gaining efficiency and power in every movement.  The selection of equipment is not something to be taken lightly, given its considerable cost, and each piece of wood is scrutinized for imperfections and knots that might interfere with its eventual bifurcation.  The weight of pulp may need to be judged solely by sight, and insights into the quirks of a log roll log can be garnered from watching other competitors.

On the lighter side, these events are frequently attended by friends and family, who mingle freely with the woodsmen.  Actual hostility between teams is  rare and most competitors come to know each other by name. Booing is unheard of at woodsmen competitions: competitors cheer loudly for their own team members and for members of other teams.  Those competitors that finish last are urged on until the event is completed.  As competitors rarely have any experience in woodsmen before entering college competition, novice competitors are actively recruited from students with no previous wood chopping experience.

Equipment
In the sport not only is skill required but you also need to use the right equipment. When competing you will need a few basic items: cross-cut saws, bow saws, axes, peaveys, foot and leg protection, and climbing gear for the pole climb.

To start when looking at saws there are a few types to choose from, including M-Tooth, and Peg and Raker. Depending on your skill level most beginners will start on a M-Tooth because they are a much more "forgiving" saw and move up to the Peg and Raker as they become better. These saws can run you anywhere from $1000 to $2500. Next are the bow saws, not like the ones you can buy commercially. These frames and blades are 42" long, but for most of the bow saw equipment you'll be having to look much harder to find it. Now we have the axes, these are some of the sharpest and precise tools that you'll use. There are many different grinds and makes. Some of the more popular ones are Tuatahi and Keech, but there are others starting to become more popular such as Brute Force. The racing axes will run you around $550 and practice axes around $200. As far as other equipment goes it's sometimes easier to get out there and ask around, it's not always easy to find new equipment for this sport.

See also 
 Lumberjack World Championship
 Southern Forestry Conclave, including woodsman-like competitions, as well as other events
 Stihl Timbersports Series
 Wood chopping
 World Logging Championship

References

External links 
 "'Lumberjills' shine for Penn State Woodsmen Team," Penn State News, April 18, 2013
 "Lumberjills take an axe (and chainsaw) to old stereotypes," The Times (London), May 3, 2013
 "Sharpening their skills: HCC lands spot on the national lumberjack scene," Smoky Mountain News, Waynesville, NC, April 17, 2013
 STIHL Timbersports Collegiate Series

Team sports
Individual sports
University and college sports in Canada
College sports in the United States by sport
Lumberjack sports